Electric Castle Live and Other Tales is a live album and DVD/Blu-ray by Arjen Anthony Lucassen's progressive rock/metal rock opera project Ayreon, that was released on March 27, 2020. It is a live version of the 1998 studio album Into the Electric Castle, performed as an actual rock opera, complete with mise-en-scène; it is a recording of one of four live performances between September 13 and 15, 2019 in Tilburg, to celebrate the original album's 20th anniversary in a way similar to The Theater Equation, with songs from other Lucassen projects performed once the songs from the albums were all performed.

Lucassen and fellow singers Anneke van Giersbergen, Damian Wilson, Edward Reekers, Edwin Balogh, Fish, and George Oosthoek returned to reprise their roles from the original album, alongside drummer Ed Warby and flutist Thijs van Leer. New additions include John "JayCee" Cuijpers of Praying Mantis, Simone Simons of Epica, Marcela Bovio of Mayan, and Mark Jansen of both Epica and Mayan, with actor John de Lancie acting as narrator. The performance of the album was followed by a selection of songs from other Lucassen projects.

Background and recording 
After positive reactions to the Ayreon Universe shows, Lucassen decided to supervise a live version of Into the Electric Castle in a style similar to The Theater Equation, to celebrate the album's 20th anniversary.

The four Electric Castle Live and Other Tales shows were performed between September 13 and 15 of 2019 (with two performances on the last day) in Tilburg; unlike The Theater Equation, which was performed as an unofficial series of shows titled Ayreon's The Human Equation Theater Experience with the recording being later released as an official Ayreon release, Electric Castle Live and Other Tales was performed as a series of official Ayreon shows. Singers Anneke van Giersbergen, Damian Wilson, Edward Reekers, Edwin Balogh, Fish, and George Oosthoek returned to reprise their roles from the original album, alongside drummer Ed Warby and flutist Thijs van Leer; Lucassen also reprised his role as the Hippie, unlike in The Theater Equation, in which he had been replaced by Jermain "Wudstik" van der Bog and only made a small appearance at the end. New additions include John "JayCee" Cuijpers of Praying Mantis, Simone Simons of Epica, Marcela Bovio of Mayan, and Mark Jansen of both Epica and Mayan, with actor John de Lancie acting as narrator. Actor John de Lancie, of whom Lucassen was a long-time fan due to De Lancie's role as Q in Star Trek: The Next Generation, was announced on October 8, 2018 as the playing the role of "The Voice" in the last performances, replacing Peter Daltrey from the original album.

After performing the album in its entirety, the cast performed several songs from other Lucassen projects: "Shores of India" from the album The Diary by his band The Gentle Storm with Van Giersbergen, "Ashes" from the album Fate of a Dreamer by his former project Ambeon, "Out in the Real World" from Embrace the Storm by his former band Stream of Passion with Bovio and her ex-husband Johan van Stratum (who performs bass on the live album), "Pink Beatles in a Purple Zeppelin" from his solo album Lost in the New Real, and "Songs of the Ocean" from Space Metal by his project Star One with Wilson; they also performed a cover of Kayleigh", a song by Marillion from Fish's time with the band.

Release 
The album was available to pre-order in five editions: the Super Deluxe Wooden Box Set for €159,00, limited to 1500 copies worldwide, the 5-disc Earbook for €49,99, the Gold Vinyl Edition for €27,99 the 2CD + DVD edition for €17,99, and the Blu-Ray for €17,99; the Gold Vinyl Edition does not contain the tracks "Robby Valentine (piano solo)", "Kayleigh", and "Speech by Arjen & Joost".

It also features a documentary chronicling the making of the shows and the events behind-the-scenes of the show themselves.

Track listing

Personnel 

 Vocalists
 John de Lancie – Narrator
 Fish (ex-Marillion) – Highlander
 Simone Simons (Epica) – Indian
 Damian Wilson (Headspace, Maiden uniteD, ex-Threshold) – Knight
 Edwin Balogh – Roman
 Anneke van Giersbergen (The Gentle Storm, VUUR, ex-The Gathering) – Egyptian
 John Jaycee Cuijpers – Barbarian
 Arjen Anthony Lucassen – Hippie
 Edward Reekers (ex-Kayak) – Futureman
 George Oosthoek – Death
 Mark Jansen (Epica, Mayan, ex-After Forever) - Death
 Marcela Bovio (Stream of Passion, Mayan) - Backing vocals, lead vocals on "Out in the Real World"
 Dianne van Giersbergen (Ex Libris, ex-Xandria) - Backing vocals
 Jan Willem Ketelaers - Backing vocals
 Robert Soeterboek - Vocals on "Songs of the Ocean"
 Michael Mills (Toehider) - TH-1 (recorded intro to Other Tales section)
 Rutger Hauer - Voight Kampff (recorded intro to "Pink Beatles in a Purple Zeppelin")

 Production
 Arjen Anthony Lucassen – producing, mixing
 Brett Caldas-Lima – mastering

 Instrumentalists
 Ed Warby – drums
 Marcel Singor (Kayak) – lead guitar
 Ferry Duijsens (VUUR) – guitar
 Bob Wijtsma (Ex Libris) – guitar
 Johan van Stratum (VUUR, ex-Stream of Passion) – bass
 Joost van den Broek (ex-After Forever) – keyboards
 Ben Mathot – violin
 Jurriaan Westerveld – cello
 Thijs van Leer (Focus) – flute
 Robby Valentine - piano on "Robby Valentine" and "The Mirror Maze"
 Arjen Anthony Lucassen - guitar on "Songs of the Ocean"

Charts

References

Science fiction concept albums
1998 albums
Ayreon albums
Rock operas
Transmission (record label) albums